Ramkhamhaeng Station is an Airport Rail Link (Bangkok) station on Ramkhamhaeng Road and State Railway of Thailand-Eastern Line in Suan Luang District, Bangkok. Between Makkasan and Ramkhamhaeng Station might have one station, named Sun Wichai, but that station was cancelled.

Station layout

Operational time

Airport Rail Link (Bangkok) stations